An Ard is a collection of small settlements on the A832 road, close to Charlestown, in Gairloch, Ross-shire, on the east shore of Gair Loch and is within the council of Highland, Scotland.

References

Populated places in Ross and Cromarty
Gairloch